ANEFS Stadium is a multi-purpose stadium in Bucharest, Romania. It is currently used mostly for football matches and is the home ground of Comprest GIM București and Electrica București. The stadium holds 6,000 people.

It was also known as Rocar Stadium, but after ANEFS bought the stadium it renamed it.

Football venues in Romania
Sports venues in Bucharest
Multi-purpose stadiums in Romania